Fritz Bützberger (26 March 1862 – 1 November 1922) was a Swiss mathematician.

Life and work 
Bützberger was educated in the schools of Langenthal and Burgdorf before entering at ETH Zürich in 1880. He graduated in 1884 and began his teaching in his former secondary school in Langenthal. Simultaneously he studied for his doctorate that was awarded him by the university of Bern in 1888 under the advice of Ludwig Schläfli.

From 1896 he was mathematics professor at the Kantonsschule of Zürich. He also delivered some lectures on geometry to future techers in the university of Zürich. From 1903 he had a teaching post in the technical school of Burgdorf.

He was the author of several text books for secondary level very valued and reedited several times. The matters included stereometry, trigonometry, algebra and arithmetic.

He was also the editor of the oldest papers and manuscripts of Jakob Steiner.

References

Bibliography

External links 
 

19th-century Swiss mathematicians
20th-century Swiss mathematicians
1862 births
1922 deaths